Papara is a town in the far north of Ivory Coast. It is a sub-prefecture of Tengréla Department in Bagoué Region, Savanes District. A border crossing with Mali is three kilometres east of town. Papara is the northernmost sub-prefecture in Ivory Coast.

Papara was a commune until March 2012, when it became one of 1126 communes nationwide that were abolished.

In 2014, the population of the sub-prefecture of Papara was 8,866.

Villages
The 11 villages of the sub-prefecture of Papara and their population in 2014 are:

Notes

Sub-prefectures of Bagoué
Ivory Coast–Mali border crossings
Former communes of Ivory Coast